Air Chief Marshal Arup Raha, PVSM, AVSM, VM, ADC, D.Litt. (honorary) was the 21st Chief of the Air Staff of the Indian Air Force and served from 31 December 2013 to 31 December 2016. He was also the Chairman of the Chiefs of Staff Committee, a post occupied by India's senior-most military officer, who advises the government and ensures jointsmanship in the armed forces.

Early life and education 

Raha was born in a Bengali family on 26 December 1954 in the city of Baidyabati, an area under the Kolkata Metropolitan Development Authority which is in the Indian State of West Bengal. His father was a reputed doctor. He was educated at Sainik School Purulia (1970 batch).

Military training

Raha was trained at the National Defence Academy, Khadakwasla, India, from July 1970 to June 1973, and at the time of graduating from NDA in June 1973, he was awarded the Gold Medal for being the best cadet of the 44th NDA course. Subsequently, he did flying training on HT-2 and Kiran ( HJT-16 ) at the Air Force Academy, Hyderabad, before being commissioned into the Indian Air Force as a fighter pilot in Dec 1974. After flying Hunters in Operational Conversion Unit, he went on to fly Mig -21 aircraft.

Military career
Raha has flown a wide variety of combat and trainer aircraft. After initial training on the HAL HT-2, he has flown the MIG-21 and MIG-29 aircraft and has commanded a MiG-29 fighter squadron and two frontline airbases along India's Western front. As on 2 April 2010, he had 3,400 hours of flying experience. Raha previously served as the Vice Chief of the Air Staff of the Indian Air Force and as the Air Officer Commanding-in-Chief (AOC-in-C) of the Western Air Command, and that of the Central Air Command. He has also served as the Senior Air Staff Officer at Headquarters, Western Air Command and Deputy Commandant at Air Force Academy, Hyderabad.

Raha has held many important staff appointments in India and abroad.

Notable appointments held

Personal life

Arup Raha is married to Lily Raha and they have two children. The son, Atanu, is a commercial pilot who is married to Sanskriti Chatterjee Raha, a professional Kathakali dancer. The daughter, Anusree Raha, is an Indian Economic Service officer and a TEDx speaker, and is married to Bodhisattwa Biswas, an alumnus of Indian School of Business.

Awards and decorations

In 2018, the state-run Sidho Kanho Birsha University awarded Arup Raha with an honorary D.Litt. degree during its convocation ceremony.

References

Chiefs of Air Staff (India)
Vice Chiefs of Air Staff (India)
1954 births
Living people
Recipients of the Param Vishisht Seva Medal
Recipients of the Ati Vishisht Seva Medal
Recipients of the Vayu Sena Medal
Indian Air Force air marshals
Bengali people
Military personnel from Kolkata
Sainik School alumni
Indian Air Force officers